In taxonomy, the Picrophilaceae are a family of microbes within Thermoplasmatales.

Morphology and ecology

The cells are round in shape, thermophilic, heterotrophic, and obligately aerobic.  This species is hyperacidophilic, with an optimal pH of 0.7. Its optimal temperature is 60 °C. It has been isolated from fumaroles, acidic sediments, dry solfataric fields, and hot springs in Hokkaidō, Japan.

See also
 List of Archaea genera

References

Further reading

Scientific journals

Scientific books

Scientific databases

External links

Archaea taxonomic families
Euryarchaeota